Roman Nykytyuk (born 9 September 1993) is a professional Ukrainian football defender who plays for Lviv.

Career
Nykytyuk attended the Sportive youth school of FC Volyn Lutsk. He made his debut for FC Volyn Lutsk played as substituted in the game against FC Zorya Luhansk on 20 April 2014 in Ukrainian Premier League.

References

External links 

 

1993 births
Living people
Footballers from Lutsk
Ukrainian footballers
Ukrainian Premier League players
FC Volyn Lutsk players
FC Rukh Lviv players
FC Mynai players
FC Karpaty Halych players
FC Hirnyk-Sport Horishni Plavni players
FC Lviv players
Association football defenders
Ukrainian First League players
Sportspeople from Volyn Oblast